Neve Yerushalayim is the oldest and largest college for Jewish women in the world. Founded in 1970 to educate baalot teshuva (female returnees to Orthodox Judaism) in the why and how of living an Orthodox Jewish life, Neve has approximately 35,000 alumni. Its campus in the Har Nof neighborhood of Jerusalem is also home to 11 schools and seminaries for post-high school, undergraduate, and graduate students from religious backgrounds.

History 
Neve was founded in 1970 by Rabbi Dovid Refson, the British-born alumnus of the Gateshead Yeshiva and Yeshivas Knesses Chizkiyahu. After his marriage, he entered the kollel at the Harry Fischel Institute in Jerusalem and began delivering shiurim to American students. Deciding to open his own yeshiva, he placed an advertisement in The Jerusalem Post and was surprised when three young women showed up. "I thought yeshivah meant for boys, but apparently, in some places, yeshivah can mean a girls' school as well", he said. The staff "adapted" to the new reality, and Neve was born. Soon after, Rabbi Moshe Chalkowski came on board as principal.

Students began arriving at the school on the recommendation of Rabbi Shlomo Freifeld, Rabbi Shlomo Carlebach, and the Chabad movement. The student body was older than Refson expected; while he was only 24 years old at the time, Neve's first students were in their late twenties and early thirties; some were as much as ten years his senior. In its early years, Neve was considered an unofficial sister school to the Ohr Somayach yeshiva for baal teshuva men in Jerusalem.

First located in the Bayit Vegan neighborhood of Jerusalem, Neve expanded in the 1970s with a Hebrew division, a preparatory school, and the one-year Shalhevet program. In the 1980s, Neve added a French division and the Machon Devorah seminary. The latter seminary has since been joined on campus by other seminaries designed for post-high-school women from religious backgrounds (see list below). According to Refson, the idea of adding seminaries to the baalot teshuvah campus was meant to augment the girls' experience of Judaism, "creating a culture where kashrus, Shabbos and tzniyus are taken for granted".

Curriculum 
Neve offers courses for beginner through advanced levels. From the start, instructors focused on the practical applications of Jewish law.  Subjects include kashrut, the laws of family purity, and the laws of Shabbat and Jewish holidays. The curriculum also includes Tanakh and Jewish literature, aside from Talmud.

Student body 
The English-speaking student body at Neve hails from the United States, Canada, Great Britain, South Africa, and Australia. In 2014, the school maintained a student body of 900 women. As of 2019, the average age of students is post-graduate; many obtained professional qualifications before coming to study here. As of 2019, Neve has approximately 35,000 alumni. The college is also a drop-in site for North American and South American kiruv groups, and summer visits by college students, Birthright groups, and visiting professionals.

Campus 
Neve acquired its  campus in Har Nof with significant funding from the Committee for Aid and Development Abroad chaired by United States Senator Daniel Inouye. The main building and two dormitories opened in 1987. As of 2016, the campus includes 12 academic buildings and eight dormitories, plus an auditorium, amphitheater, and synagogue. The Family Institute at Neve Yerushalayim, a family counseling clinic staffed by over 60 religious therapists, sees more than 400 clients monthly.

Faculty

Administration 
 Rabbi Dovid Refson, founder and dean
 Rabbi Moshe Chalkowski, founding principal
 Rabbi Avraham Edelstein, director of education
 Chaya Levine, dean of students
 Rabbi Yona Aryeh Refson, chief operating officer

Teachers 
Teachers at Neve have become noted authors, speakers, and academics in the Orthodox world. They include:
 Rabbi Dr. David Refson
 Rabbi Yona Arieh Refson
 Rebbetzin Tziporah Heller 
 Rabbi Avraham Edelstein
 Mrs. Chaya Levine
 Rabbi Eliezer Liff 
 Rabbi Yaakov (Jerrold) Marcus 
 Mrs. Chaya Levitan
 Mrs. Malka Glick
 Mrs. Raquel Kirszenbaum
 Mrs. Rutie Abraham
 Rabbi Haim Gottesman
 Rabbi Menachem Salasnik
 Dayan Shlomo Cohen
 Rabbi Avi Klotz
 Mrs. Rina Silber
 Mrs. Leah Levy
 Mrs. Ayelet Elnekave
 Mrs. Sarah Slater
 Mrs. Jenny Serle
 Mrs. Tobi Stern
 Miss Galia Kalfa
 Rabbi Avraham Kilstein

Notable alumni
 Ahuva Gray, Jewish convert and author
 Lori Palatnik, founder of the Jewish Women’s Renaissance Project

Campus overview

Colleges 
 Neve School of General Jewish Studies – targets English-speaking students
 Neve Shoshana – mainly for Hebrew speaking students residing in Israel.

High schools 
 Seminar Lapidot

Post high-school programs 
 Bnos Avigail - one-year BY seminary headed by Rabbi Dovid Kass and Rebbetzin Tzipora Heller
 Bnos Sarah – one-year teacher training program with advanced academic curriculum in Limudei Kodesh for graduates of Bais Yaakov high schools
 Midreshet Tehillah (founded in 2002) – focuses on text-based learning of Tanakh, halakha, and Jewish philosophy

Post-seminary programs 
 Maalot Yerushalayim (founded 1984) – offers programs of advanced Judaic studies and courses in various academic areas, with credits toward a B.A. degree from Thomas Edison State University 
 Rinat Tzipporah
 Center for Foreign Studies

Post-graduate programs 
 The Family Institute

See also 
 Bais Yaakov 
 Midrasha
 Women in Judaism

References

Notes

Sources

External links 
 

Jewish seminaries
Colleges in Israel
Baalei teshuva institutions
Orthodox Jewish schools for women
Educational institutions established in 1970